The Šoštanj Fault is a fault in Slovenia. It connects the Periadriatic Fault with the Lavanttal Fault and strikes NW-SE. Movements along the fault are dextral strike-slip and took place in the Pliocene. The fault is named after the town of Šoštanj.

References

Geology of Slovenia
Seismic faults of Europe